This is a list of Iranian football transfers for the 2020 summer transfer window. Only moves from Persian Gulf Pro League are listed.
The summer transfer window will begin on 27 August 2020 and closes at midnight on 19 November 2020.
Players without a club may join at any time. This list includes transfers featuring at least one Iran Football League club which were completed after the end of the winter 2019–20 transfer window on 13 January and before the end of the 2020 summer window.

Rules and regulations 
According to Iran Football Federation rules for 2020–21 Persian Gulf Pro League, each Football Club is allowed to take up to maximum 7 new Iranian player from the other clubs who already played in the 2019–20 Persian Gulf Pro League season. In addition to these seven new players, each club is allowed to take up to 3 players from Free agent (who did not play in 2020–21 Persian Gulf Pro League season or doesn't list in any 2020–21 League after season's start) during the season. Under-25 years old players must be under contract of the club in the previous season. Under-21 and under-19 years old players can also be signed during the season.

Players limits
The Iranian Football Clubs who participate in 20–21 Iranian football different levels are allowed to have up to maximum 63 players in their player lists, which will be categorized in the following groups:
 Up to maximum 20 adult (without any age limit) players
 Up to maximum 4 under-25 players (i.e. the player whose birth is after 1 January 1996).
 Up to maximum 9 under-23 players (i.e. the player whose birth is after 1 January 1998).
 Up to maximum 15 under-21 players (i.e. the player whose birth is after 1 January 2000).
 Up to maximum 15 under-19 players (i.e. the player whose birth is after 1 January 2002).

Persian Gulf Pro League

Aluminium 

In:

Out:

Esteghlal 

In:

Out:

Foolad 

In:

Out:

Gol Gohar 

In:

Out:

Machine Sazi 

In:

Out:

Mes Rafsanjan 

In:
Sepidrood Rasht S.C.

Out:

Naft Masjed-Soleyman 

In:

Out:

Nassaji 

In:

Out:

Paykan 

In:

Out:

Persepolis 

In:

Out:

Saipa 

In:

Out:

Sanat Naft 

In:

Out:

Shahr Khodro 

In:

Out:

Sepahan 

In:

Out:

Tractor 

In:

Out:

Zob Ahan 

In:

Out:

Azadegan League

Pars Jonoubi 

In:

Out:

Shahin Bushehr 

In:

Out:

Notes and references

Football transfers summer 2020
2020-21
Transfers